Zlati Rep is a small settlement in the Municipality of Ribnica in southern Slovenia. It is part of the traditional region of Lower Carniola and is included in the Southeast Slovenia Statistical Region.

References

External links
Zlati Rep on Geopedia

Populated places in the Municipality of Ribnica